Klimovskaya is a rural locality (a village) in Nizhneslobodskoye Rural Settlement, Vozhegodsky District, Vologda Oblast, Russia. The population was 2 as of 2002.

Geography 
The distance to Vozhega is 54 km, to Derevenka is 5 km. Kholdynka, Yurkovskaya, Todelovskaya are the nearest rural localities.

References 

Rural localities in Vozhegodsky District